Yakkha may refer to:
 Yakkha people, an ethnic group of South Asia
 Yakkha language, a Sino-Tibetan language
 Yaksha, also known as yakkha, a class of spirits in South and Southeast Asian cultures

See also 
 Yakka (disambiguation)

Language and nationality disambiguation pages